MCF-7 is a breast cancer cell line isolated in 1970 from a 69-year-old White woman. MCF-7 is the acronym of Michigan Cancer Foundation-7, referring to the institute in Detroit where the cell line was established in 1973 by Herbert Soule and co-workers. The Michigan Cancer Foundation is now known as the Barbara Ann Karmanos Cancer Institute.ESRAA AHMED 

Prior to MCF-7, it was not possible for cancer researchers to obtain a mammary cell line that was capable of living longer than a few months.

The patient, Frances Mallon died in 1970. Her cells were the source of much of current knowledge about breast cancer. At the time of sampling, she was a nun in the convent of Immaculate Heart of Mary in Monroe, Michigan under the name of Sister Catherine Frances.

MCF-7 and two other breast cancer cell lines, named T-47D and MDA-MB-231, account for more than two-thirds of all abstracts reporting studies on mentioned breast cancer cell lines, as concluded from a Medline-based survey.

Characteristics of MCF-7 cells
MCF-7 cells have the following characteristics:
Primary tumor (invasive breast ductal carcinoma)
Originate from pleural effusion
Estrogen receptors present
Proliferative response to estrogens
Presence of progesterone receptors
Cannot have ERBB2 gene amplification (with Her2/neu protein overexpression)
Tumorigenic in mice but only with estrogen supplementation if engrafted into the subcutaneous fat or mammary fat pad
Tumorigenic in mice without estrogen supplementation if engrafted intraductally
Luminal epithelial phenotype

This cell line retained several characteristics of differentiated mammary epithelium, including the ability to process estradiol via cytoplasmic estrogen receptors and the capability of forming domes.

Tumor necrosis factor alpha (TNF alpha) inhibits the growth of MCF-7 breast cancer cells. Treatment with anti-estrogens can modulate the secretion of insulin-like growth factor binding proteins. Omega-3 and 6 fatty acids such as EPA, DHA and AA has been reported to inhibit MCF-7 cell line growth and proliferation.

PIK3CA helical mutations were identified in MCF-7, but with low AKT activation.

References

External links

The University of Texas MD Anderson Breast Cancer Cell Line Data Base
Cellosaurus entry for MCF-7

Human cell lines
Breast cancer